North Druid Hills, also known as Briarcliff or Toco Hills, is an unincorporated community and census-designated place (North Druid Hills CDP) in DeKalb County, Georgia, United States. The population was 18,947 at the 2010 census. The commercial center of the area is the Toco Hill Shopping Center, located near the intersection of North Druid Hills Road and Lavista Road.

Geography

The CDP boundaries are:
 Interstate 85 to the north, across which is the Buford Highway corridor and the city of Brookhaven
 Clairmont Road and the North Decatur CDP and city of Decatur to the east
 the South Fork of Peachtree Creek and the Druid Hills CDP to the south, and
 the DeKalb County boundary with the city of Atlanta to the west

Neighborhoods
 Biltmore Acres. South of LaVista Rd., west of Houston Mill Rd. & north of the South Branch of Peachtree Creek.
 Briarcliff Heights. NW of Mount Brian Woods.
 Green Hills. North of Briarcliff Rd. & south of I-85.
 LaVista Park. East of DeKalb/Fulton line and west of Briarcliff Road.
 Merry Hills. Between LaVista Rd. & North Druid Hills Rd.
 Mount Brian Woods. North of North Druid Hills Rd., NW of LaVista Rd. & west of Clairmont Rd.
 Sheridan Court. In CDP NW corner, around Sheridan Drive.
 Woodland Hills. South of LaVista Road between Briarcliff Road & DeKalb County boundary.
 Mason Mill.  South of North Druid Hills Road & LaVista Road, between Clairmont Road & Houston Mill.
 Vistavia Hills. On Vistavia Circle between Clairmont Road & Mason Woods Drive.
Executive Park. Developed in the early 1970s as one of Atlanta's first mixed-use developments; located at I-85 and North Druid Hills Road.
Fama Pines. Consisting of the long dead end Fama Drive and the smaller Jacolyn Place spur, The entrance to Fama Pines is due north of the LaVista Road and N. Druid Hills intersection. Active since the 1950s.

Toco Hills
Toco Hills is a large commercial and residential neighborhood in the eastern portion of the North Druid Hills CDP. The commercial component consists of two major shopping centers that are located at the intersection of LaVista and North Druid Hills roads that were developed in the 1950s. While it is generally accepted that the name "Toco Hills" is derived from the Toco Hill shopping center, the origin of that name is disputed. Some sources claim that the developer chose the name Toco because it was the Brazilian Indian word for "good luck." Other sources claim Toco is an informal abbreviation of "top of the County." In any case, the shopping center was developed on what was a hill, and the name gradually changed to "Toco Hills." The area is home to a large Orthodox Jewish population, and marked by wooded subdivisions featuring mostly ranch homes surrounding the commercial area.

Demographics

2020 census

As of the 2020 United States census, there were 20,385 people, 8,672 households, and 3,215 families residing in the CDP.

2000 census
As of the census of 2000, there were 18,852 people, 9,760 households, and 3,074 families residing in the CDP. Population density was 3,790.0 people per square mile (1,464.5/km). CDP ethnic makeup was 82.50% White, 7.30% African American, 0.15% Native American, 4.32% Hispanic or Latino (any race), 6.73% Asian, 0.03% Pacific Islander, 1.44% from other races, and 1.85% from two or more races.

There were 9,760 households, of which 10.0% had children under age 18 living with them, 24.9% were married couples living together, 4.4% had a female householder with no husband present, and 68.5% were non-families. 45.5% of all households were made up of individuals, and 10.6% had someone living alone who was 65 years of age or older.  Average household size was 1.84 and average family size was 2.67.

CDP population had 9.9% under age 18, 16.6% from 18 to 24, 40.8% from 25 to 44, 16.1% from 45 to 64, and 16.7% who were age 65 or over.  Median age was 33 years.  For every 100 females, there were 92.7 males.  For every 100 females age 18 or over, there were 92.3 males.

CDP household median income was $48,530, and family median income was $67,956 (these figures rose to $53,028 and $84,248 respectively as of a 2007 estimate). Males had a median income of $45,313 versus $37,327 for females. CDP per capita income was $33,288.  About 4.9% of families and 13.7% of the population were below the poverty line, including 9.3% of those under age 18 and 8.4% of those age 65 or over.

History
One of the earliest European settlers in north DeKalb County was Chapman Powell, whose "Medicine House" cabin was built near the intersection of Clairmont and North Decatur roads (later relocated to Stone Mountain Park, where it still stands). Dr. Powell (1798–1870) owned most of the land in the Candler Lake and South Fork Peachtree Creek area during his lifetime. His land was later purchased by Walter Candler.

Major Washington Jackson Houston owned land on the north side of the South Fork of Peachtree Creek, in what is now Briarcliff. Visitors used to visit Major Houston to buy ground cornmeal produced by his 1876 gristmill or to attend social gatherings held on his property.  Major Houston converted the mill into an early hydroelectric plant circa 1900. Atlanta contractor Harry J. Carr bought Houston's land in the 1920s and constructed the fieldstone and wrought iron home now known as the Houston Mill House.  Emory University purchased the home in the 1960s and renovated it.  Houston Mill House, located at 849 Houston Mill Road, is now open for dining and special events.

After World War II and continuing into the 1950s, many Jews moved out of Washington-Rawson, where Turner Field now stands, and the Old Fourth Ward into North Druid Hills and Morningside/Lenox Park. Congregation Beth Jacob, an orthodox synagogue, moved to LaVista Road in 1962, and the neighborhood has since become a hub of Orthodox Judaism for the Atlanta area with three Jewish schools, six congregations and a mikveh located along or near LaVista Road.

The North Druid Hills CDP remained rural until 1965, when Executive Park was constructed on a former dairy farm as the first suburban office park in metropolitan Atlanta.  Following the completion of Executive Park, the area boomed with suburban development. The 19-story Executive Park Motor Hotel, built in the 1970s at the southeast corner of I-85 and North Druid Hills Road and which later served as a BellSouth training center, was a modernist landmark until its demolition in November 2014 after being purchased by Children's Healthcare of Atlanta for $9.6 million in January 2013.

Government and infrastructure
The United States Postal Service operates the Druid Hills Post Office at 1799 Briarcliff Road NE in the CDP. The area uses an Atlanta, GA city designation for mailing purposes.

Incorporation movement
Following the incorporation of Brookhaven in 2012, the idea of incorporating a city of Briarcliff was proposed by a civic group known as the North Druid Hills Study Group. Supporters cited more local control as reasons in favor of cityhood, while those against cityhood cited the lack of an identity, center, and boundaries as reasons against. The city of Briarcliff boundaries would be:
 I-85 on the north
 I-285 on the east, 
 on the south, the cities of Decatur and Avondale Estates; unincorporated DeKalb county, as well as the Druid Hills neighborhood of the City of Atlanta, keeping in mind that unincorporated Druid Hills and the Emory University area would be part of Briarcliff
 City of Atlanta (Virginia-Highland, Morningside-Lenox Park and Lindridge-Martin Manor neighborhoods) on the west.

In March 2014 after failure of the first initiative the City of Briarcliff Initiative, Inc. announced plans for a second attempt at cityhood, which it dubbed "Briarcliff 2.0".

Diplomatic missions
The Consulate-General of Mexico in Atlanta is in the North Druid Hills CDP.

Education
DeKalb County Schools serves the CDP. Briar Vista Elementary School, the zoned school of most of North Druid Hills, is in the CDP. Some portions are served by Sagamore Hills Elementary School. Residents in North Druid Hills are also zoned to Druid Hills Middle School (in North Decatur CDP) and Druid Hills High School (in Druid Hills CDP).

The Margaret Harris Comprehensive School, an alternative K-12 county school for disabled children, is in North Druid Hills.

Parochial schools:
The Roman Catholic Archdiocese of Atlanta operates the Immaculate Heart of Mary School, a parochial school, at 2855 Briarcliff Road in the CDP. The school initially had 238 pupils when it opened in August 1958. An addition was installed in circa the late 1960s/early 1970s.

Private schools:
 Annunciation Day School (ADS), at the Greek Orthodox Cathedral, 2500 Clairmont Road, NE. Private Greek Orthodox Christian pre-school. Private Greek Orthodox Christian elementary school (K-8). 
 Atlanta Montessori International School, 1970 Cliff Valley Way. Private pre-school - middle school.
 Cliff Valley School, 2426 Clairmont Rd. Private elementary school.
 Intown Community School, 2059 LaVista Rd. Private PCA-affiliated school.
 Torah Day School of Atlanta, 1985 Lavista Road NE. Private  K-8 Orthodox Jewish day school
 Yeshiva Ohr Yisrael, 1458 Holly Lane. Private Orthodox Jewish boys high school.
 Temima High School, 1985-B Lavista Road. Private Orthodox Jewish girls high school

The Southern Association of Colleges and Schools Commission on Colleges is headquartered in North Druid Hills.

Culture
The Greek Orthodox Archdiocese of America Metropolis of Atlanta is headquartered in North Druid Hills.

Parks

 Kittredge Park, 1520 Kittredge Park Rd.,  park with baseball field, pool and multi-use court.
 LaVista Park, 1319 Brookforest Dr.,  DeKalb County park with playground and picnic area.
 W.D. Thomson Park, [often misspelled "Thompson"] 1760 Mason Mill Rd. (off Mason Woods Drive),  DeKalb County park with courts, playground, creek, picnic area and trails.

Transportation
 Briarcliff Rd. Major road unifying the CDP.
 Interstate 85. CDP northern boundary.
 LaVista Rd.  Primary E-W road.
  North Druid Hills Rd. Primary access from Interstate 85.

References

External links
 Clairmont Heights Civic Association
 Houston Mill House
 LaVista Park Civic Association
 Lindbergh-LaVista Corridor Coalition
 Merry Hills  Homeowners Association
 North Druid Hills Residents Association
 Woodland Hills Neighborhood Association

 
Census-designated places in DeKalb County, Georgia
Unincorporated communities in DeKalb County, Georgia
Unincorporated communities in the Atlanta metropolitan area
Jewish communities in the United States
Unincorporated communities in Georgia (U.S. state)